Nataliya Horodilova (born 16 May 1950) is a Russian rower. She competed in the women's coxless pair event at the 1976 Summer Olympics.

References

1950 births
Living people
Russian female rowers
Olympic rowers of the Soviet Union
Rowers at the 1976 Summer Olympics
Sportspeople from Vladikavkaz